George W. Barrett (February 28, 1887 – March 24, 1936), also known as "The Diamond King" and "Bad George," was an American car thief and murderer who became the first person sentenced to death by hanging under a congressional act that made it a capital offense to kill a federal agent.

Early life

Barrett was born in Kentucky, one of at least seven children of William Barrett and Nancy Jane Bowling. He had worked as a streetcar conductor in Cincinnati and was a "career hoodlum, moonshiner, car thief and murderer" prior to killing the federal agent. He was known as the "Diamond King" because he supposedly carried diamonds in his pocket.

On September 2, 1930, Barrett shot and killed his own 71-year-old mother (who had reportedly whipped his 11-year-old son) and pistol whipped his sister Rachel, who was shot through the ear. His two brothers posted a $500 reward for his capture.  After eight months of being on the run, he turned himself in the next spring and was charged with killing his mother and wounding his sister. The trial resulted in a hung jury. It was later reported that he had been tried for killing both his mother and sister, however, while he later admitted he had shot his mother in self-defense, he denied killing his sister, who he said died of pneumonia. (According to records, Rachael Barrett Maupin did die of double bronchial pneumonia on October 18, 1930, a month after the attack.)

Shootout

Barrett came to the attention of the FBI because he was wanted for car theft and interstate transportation of vehicles as far as California. Barrett would buy a model of a popular car and then steal an identical one. He would then sell the stolen car to an unsuspecting buyer using the papers of the car he bought legitimately. He had warrants for his arrest in San Diego and in Indiana.

On August 16, 1935, FBI agents Nelson B. Klein and Donald McGovern had tracked Barrett to West College Corner, Indiana, and called the sheriff for assistance. Klein spotted Barrett standing by a car and gave chase on foot, not realizing that Barrett was armed with a .45 caliber Colt revolver. Barrett ran to a home owned by Mrs. Agatha McDonough and barricaded himself behind a garage, where he began to shoot at Klein and McGovern. Klein, a 37-year-old agent from Cincinnati, was shot six times in his chest and arms. The mortally wounded Klein fired back, along with McGovern. Barrett was shot in the knees and had two broken legs.

Klein died on the spot. Homeowner Agatha McDonough was the first to reach Barrett, who was lying wounded in her yard. According to McDonough, Barrett bragged to her, "I beat him to the trigger. I shot him."

Shortly thereafter, the local police arrived, and Barrett was taken to a local hospital and treated for his wounds. After several days he was released and then taken to Indianapolis, where he was tried and convicted of the murder of a federal agent.

Trial and execution
On December 7, 1935, he was convicted of first degree murder in the death of special agent Nelson B. Klein by a federal jury.

The state of Indiana had adopted the electric chair as a method of execution in 1913, and was unprepared to carry out Barrett's preference for hanging as the method of execution. On March 24, 1936, a farmer, Phil Hanna, who had taken up the study of hanging executions as a hobby, was called upon to perform the execution by the method required by the sentence. Before the trap was sprung at 12:02 pm, Barrett was asked if he had any last words, but did not respond. Barrett was still crippled from his wounds at the time of his execution, and had to be carried to the gallows on a stretcher and supported by deputy marshals. Barrett's last request was to see his younger brother, John, but no response was received to a telegram sent before his execution. There were approximately 50 official witnesses to his death. He was 49 years old at the time of death. For his customary last meal, Barrett had ordered the "biggest steak in town". However he did not eat it and instead after his death, a reporter who was present at his execution, came across Barrett's steak in the jail's kitchen and helped himself to it.

See also 

 Capital punishment by the United States federal government
 List of people executed by the United States federal government

References

1887 births
1936 deaths
20th-century executions by Indiana
Executed people from Kentucky
Burials in Indiana
American people executed for murdering police officers
20th-century executions of American people
People from Clay County, Kentucky
People executed by the United States federal government by hanging
People convicted of murder by the United States federal government
20th-century executions by the United States federal government